St. Catherine's Church of Lomice, North Dakota, near Whitman, North Dakota, United States, was built in 1936. It was designed by architect Joseph Bell DeRemer in Late Gothic Revival style. It has also been known as St. Catherine's Catholic Church, as St. Catherine's Church, and as St. Catherine Church. It was listed on the National Register of Historic Places in 2006.

It has a large grotto and three small grottoes. The church was founded by settlers from Bohemia in Czechoslovakia.

References

Czech-American culture in North Dakota
Gothic Revival church buildings in North Dakota
Churches on the National Register of Historic Places in North Dakota
Roman Catholic churches completed in 1936
Former Roman Catholic church buildings in North Dakota
National Register of Historic Places in Walsh County, North Dakota
Joseph Bell DeRemer buildings
20th-century Roman Catholic church buildings in the United States
1936 establishments in North Dakota